The fulgorid insect Fulgora laternaria (often misspelled "lanternaria"), is a planthopper known by a large variety of common names, among them lantern fly, peanut bug, peanut-headed lanternfly, alligator bug, jequitiranaboia, machaca, chicharra-machacuy, and cocoposa.

Description
The insect was originally - and mistakenly - believed to be luminescent. When attacked, it protects itself by displaying large, yellow, fake eyes on its hind wings to frighten the aggressor, and releases a foul-smelling substance. Adults can be found from June to December. They feed on the sap of plants, mainly from some trees as Hymenaea courbaril, Simarouba amara and Zanthoxylum species. It will generally remain camouflaged on a tree trunk during the day.

It will knock its head on a hollow tree to create vibrations for mates. It will lay its eggs on the Hymenaea courbaril or quapinol tree, and coat them in a waxy substance for protection. 

Several very similar species in the genus occur from Central to South America, and many museum and commercial specimens identified as laternaria are actually other species.

Distribution and habitat
This species inhabits tropical forests in Mexico, Central America and South America.

History 
In the 1970s, a Colombian reporter on a trip to Putumayo Department wrote a chronicle about this insect, and related the folk tale that if it bites you, it would cause death unless the affected person practiced a sexual act within 24 hours. Although this species is not venomous, the publication of this text in a national magazine gave notoriety to both the author and the claim.

Gallery

References

Wesmael C. (1837) Phosphorescence du Fulgore porte-lanterne, L'institut, Journal Universel des Sciences et des Sociétés Savantes en France et à l'Etranger. 1re Section. Sciences mathématiques, physiques et naturelles. Paris, 5: 259.
Catalogue of Life
NCBI
 Carrol L. Henderson  Butterflies, Moths, and Other Invertebrates of Costa Rica: A Field Guide

External links

 Insecta Culture 
 Especies de Costa Rica
 Art and Nature
 Acguanacaste
 Carnivoraforum

Fulgorinae
Insects of South America
Fauna of the Amazon